Bossard Group is an international Swiss fastener technology and logistics company with its headquarters in Zug. Their activities include worldwide sales, technical consulting and inventory management. The Group employs more than 2,700 people at 84 locations in Europe, America and Asia/Pacific and generated a turnover of 1.15 billion Swiss francs in 2022. Bossard Group is listed on the Swiss Stock Exchange SIX Swiss Exchange.

History 

The company was founded in 1831 in Zug as a hardware store by Franz Kaspar Bossard-Kolin. The earlier silk trading business inherited from his father-in-law was dissolved at the same time. The hardware store kept its local character for roughly a century before the company expanded its business activities in the 1930s and 1940s to trading fasteners. The local specialized store first developed into a regional, and from the 1950s on, into a national company. In the 1960s, Bossard began to set up and expand an international network of bases. In the course of this expansion, the company went public on the stock market in 1987. The recession at the beginning of the 1990s and the associated worsening business trend led Bossard to a review of the entire organization. In doing so, the company focused on the core competence of fastening technology and the gradual selling off of all its tools, fittings and handicraft units. Bossard today is active in the field of fastening technology in Europe, America and Asia.

In November 2012, the Bossard group acquired the KVT Koenig Group's range of fastening technology. At the beginning of 2019, Bossard Group acquired BRUMA Schraub- und Drehtechnik GmbH in Velbert. On June 24, 2019, the company also acquired the distribution business of SACS Boysen Aerospace Group, which continues to operate under the Boysen name. Bossard Group also increased its majority stake in Torp Fasteners, based in Oslo, Norway, from 60% to 100% at the beginning of 2020. Bossard has held a stake in the company, which specializes in high-quality fasteners, since January 2015. In December 2020 Bossard acquired shares in MultiMaterial-Welding GmbH, thus expanding its portfolio to include pioneering lightweight fastening solutions. In October 2021, Bossard Group acquired the Dutch company Jeveka B.V., thus substantially expanding its presence in the Benelux countries.

Field of activity 
The company is engaged in product solutions and services in the industrial fastening technology. The product range comprises over 1,000,000 fasteners and customer-specific application solutions, combined with services in the areas of Smart Factory Logistics and Assembly Technology Expert. Bossard maintains an international procurement network for screws and fasteners. The company works together with 4,600 manufacturers.

Trivia 
The company has secured the naming rights to the new stadium of EV Zug for ten years from 2010. The ice hockey stadium is listed under the name of Bossard Arena. Bossard AG has exercised its option to extend the naming contract for the period from August 1, 2020 to July 31, 2025. The extension is part of the contract concluded in 2010 for the naming rights of the then newly built ice stadium.

References 

Companies listed on the SIX Swiss Exchange
Companies based in Zug
Engineering companies of Switzerland
Fastening tool manufacturers
Logistics companies of Switzerland